A conical roof or cone roof is a  cone-shaped roof that is circular at its base and terminates in a point.

Distribution 

Conical roofs are frequently found on top of towers in medieval town fortifications and castles, where they may either sit directly on the outer wall of the tower (sometimes projecting beyond it to form eaves) or form a superstructure above the fighting platform or terrace of the tower. The latter necessitated the use of spouts to lead the water away over the top of the walls (e.g. as at Andernach's Alter Krahnen). In this case the cone roof was surrounded by a protective wall, a parapet or a battlement. Such conical roofs were usually constructed using a timber-framed support structure covered with slate; more rarely they were made of masonry.

A small circular turret or tourelle with a conical roof is called a pepperpot or pepperbox turret.

Today, conical roofs are more often used in rural areas either for circular or small square buildings. They are difficult to construct but use locally available materials.

Conical roofs are widely used in Armenian and Georgian church architecture.

A key feature of the Solomon Islands Parliament Building is its conical roof.

See also
 List of roof shapes

References 

Roofs